Kandara Band or Kandara is a musical group from Pokhara, Nepal. The band formed in 1994 and takes its name after the Nepalese word for "a gorge or a cave in the middle of remote hills or mountains".

Kandara is best known for helping to establish the folk-pop genre within the Nepalese music industry. With its distinctive melodies, simple, folk-based lyrics, and soulful vocal performance, the band has produced several songs such as: "Leka ki hey Maya," "Hongkong Pokhara," "Tagaroma rumal Rakhi," "Timi pari tyo Gauma," "Bideshiyera gaien Uni," and "Chanchale kanchhiko joban."  The band is known for creating new lyrics for existing popular songs, emphasizing themes of nationalism, human misery, love, and nature. Kandara was among the first in the industry to collaborate with famous Nepalese poets and lyricists such as Sarubhakta Shrestha, Binod Gauchan and Ramesh Shrestha to write lyrics - a practice which has now become popular within the Nepalese music industry.

In 2016, Kandara made a comeback with the release of a new album featuring the popular song, "Bhedi Gothaima".

Impact and Style
In the past 26 years, Kandara has performed both nationally and internationally. Kandara's first album, Chanchale Kanchhi, was released in 1994. The title song of the album, Chanchale Kanchhi was a critical success, and can now be seen as a milestone for the band. Songs released in 1996 such as "Lekaki hey maya", "Timi pari", and "Bideshiyera gaeen uni", from the album, Dandapari, further established the band among fans as one known for its compositions with themes of love and tragedy. "Hong Kong-Pokhara", the title song of the Hong Kong-Pokhara album, found its fame beyond Pokhara and Nepal and became popular among migrant Nepalese around the globe. After 8-years break, Kandara was rejuvenated in 2006 by another hit, "Tagaroma Rumal Raakhi". The album Barshaun Pachhi, has earned numerous awards and still has an influential impact on the band's fan base.

Comeback
The band marked their comeback with Bhedi Gothaiima. The album features a total of eight songs, along with an older hit, "Timi Pari." After the release of the album, the band toured Nepal. Kandara collaborated  with senior writer, singer, actor and musician Surbhakta.

Recent Success
On April 14, 2015, Kandara released a practice-session video of their new single "Bhedi Gothaima" on the video sharing site YouTube. The song, penned by veteran Nepali writer Sarubhakta, is one of the songs from the band's upcoming album, which is scheduled for a summer release.

The band released their debut album Chanchale Kanchi in 1994. Since then, they have gone on to release six more records. After an eight-year hiatus, the forthcoming album will be the band's eighth. Music company Stereo Records will be producing the album. The album will feature a total of eight songs, along with an older hit "Timi Pari". After the release of the album, the band plans to tour the country. According to Stereo Records manager Ashish Parajuli, the band intends to perform with a full-fledged orchestra before Dashain. The name of the new album has not yet been disclosed.

When Kandara started out twenty-one years ago, the band was a five-piece outfit, but after several line-up changes, it now consists of Sunil Thapa, Buddharaj Bajracharya and Bivek Shrestha. The band is known for blending Nepali folk styles with pop music. Through time, Kandara have established themselves as one of the most popular folk-pop acts in Nepal. "Lekaki Hey Maya", "Hong Kong Pokhara", "Danda Pari", "Tagaroma Rumal Rakhi" and "Chanchale Kanchi" are some of the band's most popular songs.

Albums
1994: Chanchale Kanchi
1996: Danda Pari
1998: Hong Kong Pokhara
2006: Barshaun Pachi
2016: Bhedi Gothaima

References 

Nepalese musical groups
Musical groups established in 1994
1994 establishments in Nepal
Musical groups from Pokhara